The following is a list of international bilateral treaties between Australia and Austria

 Before 1948, treaties with Austria were extended to Australia by the British Empire, however they are still generally in force.
 Earlier treaties are from the Austria-Hungary Empire
 Later treaties with the European Union (not included)

References

Treaties of Australia
Treaties of Austria